The 1983 Yale Bulldogs football team represented Yale University in the 1983 NCAA Division I-AA football season. The Bulldogs were led by 19th-year head coach Carmen Cozza, played their home games at the Yale Bowl and finished last in the Ivy League with a 1–6 record, 1–9 overall.

By finishing last in the Ivy League, this Yale team would be the last team for the next five years to place below Columbia in the standings, as the Lions embarked on a 44-game losing streak, at the time the longest in NCAA Division I history. Columbia's October 15 date at the Yale Bowl would also serve as the program's final win before the start of the streak, which would encompass all of the 1984-1987 seasons. Columbia would not win another game until October 8, 1988.

Schedule

Roster

References

Yale
Yale Bulldogs football seasons
Yale Bulldogs football